O Doutrinador is a 2018 Brazilian crime thriller film directed by Gustavo Bonafé, based on the homonymous comic series created by Luciano Cunha. The film is written by Gabriel Wainer, Luciano Cunha, L.G. Bayão, Rodrigo Lages and Guilherme Siman, and stars Kiko Pissolato as the title character, alongside Samuel de Assis, Tainá Medina, Nicolas Trevijano, Eduardo Moscovis, Tuca Andrada, Natália Lage, Helena Ranaldi, Eucir de Souza and Marília Gabriela.

Plot
Miguel (Kiko Pissolato) is a federal agent of the  "D.A.E." ( "Special Armed Division"), highly trained and expert in weapons. After experiencing a trauma, he leaves for a personal journey of vengeance, and assumes the identity of a masked vigilante. The "Awakener" decides to do justice with his own hands exterminating politicians and businessmen of corrupt construction firms.

Now, his biggest goal is to fight a gang of politicians and bandits who took the lead in Brazilian politics and began to govern the country thinking only of their own interests.

Cast 
 Kiko Pissolato as Miguel Montessant / The Awakener
 Tainá Medina as Nina
 Samuel de Assis as Edu
 Nicolas Trevijano as Diogo
 Eucir de Souza as Deputy Djalma Dias
 Marília Gabriela as Minister Marta Regina
 Eduardo Moscovis as Sandro Corrêa 
 Carlos Betão as Antero Gomes
 Eduardo Chagas as Oliveira
 Natália Lage as Isabela Montessant 
 Tuca Andrada as Tenente Siqueira
 Natallia Rodrigues as Penélope 
 Helena Ranaldi as Julia Machado
 Lucy Ramos as Marina Sales
 Helena Luz as Alice Montessant

Production

Development
In the same year as the publication of the first volume of O Doutrinador it was confirmed a partnership with Paris Filmes and Downtown Filmes to produce a live-action film based on the comic book. In August 2013, the first official teaser was posted on YouTube. Later Cunha and Gabriel Wainer started working on the film's screenplay.

The pre-production of the film began in mid-2017. On April 15, Downtown Filmes officially announced the release of the film during the CCXP Tour Nordeste event that was held in Olinda, Pernambuco.

Release 
O Doutrinador was released in Brazil on November 1, 2018. The film was selected to screen at the 2019 Jackie Chan Action Movie Week.

References

External links 
 

Films based on Brazilian comics
Brazilian crime thriller films
Films set in Brazil
Live-action films based on comics
Films about corruption
2010s vigilante films
2018 crime thriller films